Highway 79 is an east-west highway in northern Israel. It crosses the Zevulun Valley and the western Lower Galilee. The road leads from Kiryat Bialik to Mashhad north of Nazareth. It is 27 km long.

Development
On January 19, 2009, a tender was published to widen 8.5 km of the highway next to HaMovil Junction to 2 lanes per direction, including the construction of several interchanges, at the cost of NIS 500 million.

In the future, a tram-train connecting Haifa and Nazareth is planned to be built in the highway's median along most of the highway's route.

Junctions & Interchanges (east to west)

Places of interest on Highway 79
 Tel Afek
 Monument to the Bedouin soldier
 Hasolelim forest nature reserve
 Sepphoris (ancient village)

References

See also
List of highways in Israel
Zevulun Valley
Lower Galilee

79